Pranavi Urs (born 15 April 2003) is an amateur Indian golfer.

She won the second and third legs of the 2020 Hero Women's Pro Golf Tour.

References

Living people
Indian female golfers
Place of birth missing (living people)
2003 births
21st-century Indian women